Burundi competed at the 2020 Summer Paralympics in Tokyo, Japan, from 24 August to 5 September 2021. This was their fourth consecutive appearance at the Summer Paralympics since 2008.

Competitors
The following is the list of number of competitors participating in the Games:

Athletics 

Men's track

Women's track

See also 
 Burundi at the Paralympics
 Burundi at the 2020 Summer Olympics

External links 
 2020 Summer Paralympics website 

Nations at the 2020 Summer Paralympics
2020
Summer Paralympics